Danet is a surname. Notable people with the surname include:

Jean Danet (1924–2001), French actor, activist, and gay theorist
Pierre Danet (1650–1709), French lexicographer